Wilford Jones (January 22, 1931 – March 17, 2007), better known as Crazy Ray, was the unofficial mascot of the Dallas Cowboys. By some accounts, he was also the team's original mascot, who attended almost every home game since the team's inception.

History
He started selling pennants at games in 1962 and quickly endeared himself to the Cowboys fans with his western outfits, magic tricks, trademark whistle, and galloping along with a hobby horse.

He was never officially employed by the Cowboys, but was given a Special Parking Pass and All-access for home games. He was also known as the "Whistling Vendor" at Dallas Tornado soccer games, Texas Rangers baseball games, and at the Dallas Black Hawks minor-league professional ice hockey team at State Fair Coliseum. He could be seen at the State Fair of Texas and various concerts entertaining the public.

Crazy Ray also had a special friendship with rival Zema Williams (i.e. *Chief Zee), the Washington Redskins' unofficial mascot. In some photographs, Crazy Ray and Chief Zee were seen pretending to fight with each other during games.

Ray died on March 17, 2007, from heart disease and diabetes, aged 76, in Dallas. He missed only three games in 46 seasons.

Honors
Crazy Ray has a place in the Visa Hall of Fans Exhibit at the Pro Football Hall of Fame as he was selected as the fan choice for the Dallas Cowboys.

See also
The Barrel Man
Chief Zee
Fireman Ed
Hogettes
License Plate Guy

References

External links
 https://web.archive.org/web/20070927120948/http://cbs11tv.com/topstories/local_story_076152226.html
 https://web.archive.org/web/20061011084640/http://www.dallasobserver.com/Issues/2006-01-12/news/whitt.html
 http://www.savecrazyray.com/
http://www.dallasnews.com/sharedcontent/dws/news/localnews/stories/091406dnmetcrazyray.8fb291f.html
 https://web.archive.org/web/20070323033730/http://www.nfl.com/teams/story/DAL/10066845

1931 births
2007 deaths
Dallas Cowboys
Deaths from diabetes
National Football League mascots
Spectators of American football
People from Dallas
Place of birth missing